John Pound Store is a historic commercial building located in Plain Township, Kosciusko County, Indiana. It was built in 1838, and is a two-story, rectangular Greek Revival style frame building with a front gable roof.  It measures 20 feet wide and 49 feet deep and has a low pitched roof. It is operated by the Kosciusko County Historical Society as the Pound Store Museum.

It was listed on the National Register of Historic Places in 1992.

References

External links
 Pound Store Museum - Kosciusko County Historical Society

History museums in Indiana
Commercial buildings on the National Register of Historic Places in Indiana
Greek Revival architecture in Indiana
Commercial buildings completed in 1838
Buildings and structures in Kosciusko County, Indiana
National Register of Historic Places in Kosciusko County, Indiana
Museums in Kosciusko County, Indiana